Serious Sweet is a 2016 novel by A. L. Kennedy. It is Kennedy's 8th novel and narrates the story of a civil servant who offers letter-writing services to single women.

In July 2016, it was longlisted for the 2016 Man Booker Prize.

Awards and honors
2016 Man Booker Prize, longlistee.

References

2016 British novels
Jonathan Cape books
Novels set in one day